AIFA or Aifa may refer to:

American Indoor Football Association
Felipe Ángeles International Airport, opened in 2022, near Mexico City
Italian Medicines Agency (Agenzia italiana del farmaco)

People with the surname
Aifa Azman (born 2001), Malaysian squash player
Jean-Pierre Aïfa, a president of the Congress of New Caledonia